Jayu Park is an urban park located in Incheon, South Korea. It is seen as the city's marquee public park. Known as Freedom Park in English, it is located on a bluff overlooking the city's harbor. Prominently placed is a statue of the Korean War officer Douglas MacArthur, whose amphibious assault liberated the city. The park also houses a number of other statues, a small zoo, and a memorial to the Joseon–United States Treaty of 1882. It is the first "Western-style" urban park built in South Korea. The park is also renowned for its sakura blossoming season.

References

Parks in Incheon